Modern Girl may refer to:

 Modern girl, a Japanese Flapper
 "Modern Girl" (Meat Loaf song), 1984
 "Modern Girl" (Sheena Easton song), 1980
 "Modern Girl", a 1980 song by James Freud
 "Modern Girl", a 2005 song by Sleater-Kinney from The Woods
 Modern Girls (1937 film), a Hungarian film
 Modern Girls, a 1986 American film
 Modern Girls (soundtrack)

See also
 "Modern Woman", a 1986 song by Billy Joel